The 2005–06 ABN-AMRO Twenty-20 Cup was the second edition of the ABN-AMRO Twenty-20 Cup, a domestic Twenty20 competition in Pakistan. It was held in Karachi from 24 February to 4 March 2006. This edition featured an expanded format, with an increase from 19 to 39 matches and from 11 to 13 teams; the new teams being the Islamabad Leopards and the Abbottabad Rhinos. The Sialkot Stallions won the tournament by defeating the defending champions the Faisalabad Wolves in the final.

Format
The 13 teams are divided into two groups: Pool A with seven teams and Pool B with six. Each group plays a single round-robin tournament and the top two teams from each group advance to the semi-finals. The winners of each group play the runners-up of the other group in the semi-finals. The winners of the semi-finals play the final.

The position of the teams in the points table is determined by:
Total points
Won
Lost (fewest)
Net run rate

Results

Teams and standings
The top two teams from each group qualify for the semi-finals.

 Qualified for semi-finals

Knockout stage

Fixtures

Group stage

Pool A

Pool B

Knockout stage
Semi-finals

Final

Media coverage
Ten Sports was covering the tournament until a bomb blast in Karachi. PTV 1 covered some of the remaining matches afterwards.

 Ten Sports
 PTV 1

References

External links
Tournament page on CricketArchive
Tournament page on ESPN CricInfo

Domestic cricket competitions in 2005–06
2005–06 National T20 Cup
2006 in Pakistani cricket
Pakistani cricket seasons from 2000–01